{{Infobox election
| election_name      = 1943 Philippine presidential election
| country            = Philippines
| flag_year          = 1936
| type               = presidential
| ongoing            = no
| previous_election  = 1941 Philippine presidential election
| previous_year      = 1941
| next_election      = 1946 Philippine presidential election
| next_year          = 1946
| election_date      = September 25, 1943

| image1             = 
| nominee1           = Jose P. Laurel
| party1             = KALIBAPI
| electoral_vote1    = | percentage1        = 100.00%| map_image          = 
| map_size           = 
| map_caption        = 

| title              = President
| before_election    = None (de facto); Manuel L. Quezon (de jure)
| after_election     = Jose P. Laurel
| before_party       = Nacionalista Party
| after_party        = KALIBAPI
}}

The 1943 Philippine presidential election''' was held on September 25, 1943, at the midst of World War II.

The Japanese-sponsored Second Philippine Republic merged all parties into the KALIBAPI, thereby creating a one-party state. All of the members of the National Assembly of the Second Philippine Republic, who were elected earlier in the week, were members of the KALIBAPI. Pursuant to the 1943 constitution, Jose P. Laurel was unanimously elected president by the National Assembly. Jorge B. Vargas originally wanted to run against Laurel, but acquiesced on election eve, and consequently campaigned for the latter. The Japanese also wanted Manuel Roxas to run, but declined due to ill health for being incarcerated earlier in the year.

Result

Laurel was inaugurated on October 14, 1943 at the Legislative Building in Manila.

External links
Proclamation No. 21, s. 1943, Proclaiming the election of His Excellency, Jose P. Laurel, as President of the Republic of the Philippines.
Philippine Electoral Almanac

References

1943 elections in the Philippines
Presidential elections in the Philippines
Single-candidate elections